Hungary competed at the 2020 Winter Youth Olympics in Lausanne, Switzerland from 9 to 22 January 2020.

Medalists
Medals awarded to participants of mixed-NOC teams are represented in italics. These medals are not counted towards the individual NOC medal tally.

Alpine skiing

Boys

Girls

Curling

Hungary qualified a mixed team of four athletes.
Mixed team

Mixed doubles

Figure skating

One Hungarian figure skater achieved quota place for Hungary based on the results of the 2019 World Junior Figure Skating Championships.

Ice hockey

Short track speed skating

Two Hungarian skaters achieved quota places for Hungary based on the results of the 2019 World Junior Short Track Speed Skating Championships.

Boys

Girls

Speed skating

Girls

See also
Hungary at the 2020 Summer Olympics
Hungary at the Youth Olympics

References

2020 in Hungarian sport
Nations at the 2020 Winter Youth Olympics
Hungary at the Youth Olympics